Navachica is a mountain in the Province of Málaga in southern Spain, the highest peak in the  Sierra Almijara.

Location

The Pico Navachica is the highest peak in the Sierra Almijara.
The mountain is in the Nerja municipality of the Axarquía, which extends from the mountains down to the Mediterranean Sea.
It is in the Sierras of Tejeda, Almijara and Alhama Natural Park.

Access

The peak may be reached from the El Pinarillo recreational area near the coast to the south along the Barranco de los Cazadores route.
From the peak there is a panoramic view of the Cerro del Lucero and Maroma peaks.

Geology

The Sierra Almijara holds one of the Spain's main sources of dolomitic marble.
The marble gives white and gray tones to the ridges and ravines.
There are areas of dolomitic sands on Navachica.

Notes

Sources

Mountains of Andalusia